Mykola Volodymyrovych Dmitrishin (born 4 September 1990) is a Ukrainian badminton player.

Achievements

BWF International Challenge/Series 
Men's doubles

Mixed doubles

  BWF International Challenge tournament
  BWF International Series tournament
  BWF Future Series tournament

References

External links 
 

1990 births
Living people
Ukrainian male badminton players
21st-century Ukrainian people